Eurocommunism, also referred to as democratic communism or neocommunism, was a trend in the 1970s and 1980s within various Western European communist parties which said they had developed a theory and practice of social transformation more relevant for Western Europe. During the Cold War, they sought to reject the influence of the Soviet Union and the Communist Party of the Soviet Union. The trend was especially prominent in Italy, Spain, and France.

Terminology 
The origin of the term Eurocommunism was subject to great debate in the mid-1970s, being attributed to Zbigniew Brzezinski and Arrigo Levi, among others. Jean-François Revel once wrote that "one of the favourite amusements of 'political scientists' is to search for the author of the term Eurocommunism". In April 1977, Deutschland Archiv decided that the word was first used in the summer of 1975 by Yugoslav journalist Frane Barbieri, former editor of Belgrade's NIN newsmagazine. Outside Western Europe, it is sometimes referred to as neocommunism. This theory stresses greater independence from the Soviet Union.

Background

Theoretical foundation and inspirations 
According to Perry Anderson, the main theoretical foundation of Eurocommunism was Antonio Gramsci's writing about Marxist theory which questioned the sectarianism of the left and encouraged communist parties to develop social alliances to win hegemonic support for social reforms. Early inspirations can also be found in Austro-Marxism and its seeking of a third democratic way to socialism.

Eurocommunist parties expressed their fidelity to democratic institutions more clearly than before and attempted to widen their appeal by embracing public sector middle-class workers, new social movements such as feminism and gay liberation and more publicly questioning the Soviet Union. However, Eurocommunism did not go as far as the Anglosphere-centred New Left movement which had originally borrowed from the French , but in the course of the events went past their academic theorists, largely abandoning Marxist historical materialism, class struggle and its traditional institutions such as communist parties.

Legacy of the Prague Spring 

The Prague Spring and particularly its crushing by the Soviet Union in 1968 became a turning point for the communist world. Romania's leader Nicolae Ceaușescu staunchly criticized the Soviet invasion in a speech, explicitly declaring his support for the Czechoslovakian leadership under Alexander Dubček. While the Portuguese Communist Party, the South African Communist Party and the Communist Party, USA supported the Soviet position, the Italian Communist Party (PCI) and the Communist Party of Spain (PCE) firmly denounced the occupation. The leadership of the Communist Party of Finland (SKP), the Swedish Left Communist Party (VPK) and the French Communist Party (PCF) which had pleaded for conciliation expressed their disapproval about the Soviet intervention, with the PCF thereby publicly criticizing a Soviet action for the first time in its history. The Communist Party of Greece (KKE) suffered a major split over the internal disputes regarding the Prague Spring, with the pro-Dubček faction breaking ties with the Soviet leadership and founding the KKE Interior.

Early developments

Developments in Western European communist parties 

Some communist parties with strong popular support, notably the PCI and the PCE, adopted Eurocommunism most enthusiastically. The SKP was dominated by Eurocommunists. In the 1980s, the traditional, pro-Soviet faction broke away, calling the main party revisionist. At least one mass party such as the PCF as well as many smaller parties strongly opposed to Eurocommunism and stayed aligned to the positions of the Communist Party of the Soviet Union until the end of the Soviet Union, although the PCF did make a brief turn toward Eurocommunism in the mid-to-late 1970s.

The PCE and its Catalan referent, the United Socialist Party of Catalonia, had already been committed to the liberal possibilist politics of the Popular Front during the Spanish Civil War. The PCE's leader Santiago Carrillo wrote Eurocommunism's defining book  (Eurocommunism and the State) and participated in the development of the liberal democratic constitution as Spain emerged from the dictatorship of Francisco Franco. The Communist Party of Austria, the Communist Party of Belgium, the Communist Party of Great Britain and the Communist Party of the Netherlands also turned Eurocommunist.

The PCI in particular had been developing an independent line from Moscow for many years prior which had already been exhibited in 1968, when the party refused to support the Soviet invasion of Prague. In 1975, the PCI and the PCE had made a declaration regarding the "march toward socialism" to be done in "peace and freedom". In 1976, the PCI's leader Enrico Berlinguer had spoken of a "pluralistic system" ( translated by the interpreter as "multiform system") in Moscow and in front of 5,000 communist delegates described the PCI's intentions to build "a socialism that we believe necessary and possible only in Italy". The Historic Compromise with the Christian Democracy, stopped by the kidnapping and murder of Aldo Moro in 1978, was a consequence of this new policy.

The SKP changed its leadership in 1965 with leadership post changing from the Stalinist Aimo Aaltonen, who had even a picture of Lavrentiy Beria in his office, to a revisionist, quite popular trade unionist Aarne Saarinen. The same happened even more drastically when the Finnish People's Democratic League also changed its leadership with the reformist Ele Alenius leading it. In 1968, these were the only parties to directly oppose the actions of the Soviet militarship in Prague in 1968, therefore the two organizations split de facto into two different parties, with one reformist and one hard-line Soviet. What was peculiar was that the youth wing was nearly completely Taistoist. Progress was hard to make as the party accorded that the Taistolaist strongly pro-Soviet movement named after their leader Taisto Sinisalo had equal rights of power in the party, although it was a minority and the vast majority of the party was Eurocommunist. In 1984, with a strong Eurocommunist majority the hard-line organizations were massively expelled from the already weakened party. Pro-Soviet hard-liners formed their own cover-organization called Democratic Movement. In 1990, the new Left Alliance integrated the parties, but Alenius chose not to be member of it because they also took hard-line Taistolaists.

Western European communists came to Eurocommunism via a variety of routes. For some, it was their direct experience of feminist and similar action while for others it was a reaction to the political events of the Soviet Union at the apogee of what Mikhail Gorbachev later called the Era of Stagnation. This process was accelerated after the events of 1968, particularly the crushing of the Prague Spring. The politics of détente also played a part. With war less likely, Western communists were under less pressure to follow Soviet orthodoxy yet also wanted to engage with a rise in Western proletarian militancy such as Italy's Hot Autumn and Britain's Shop Stewards Movement.

Further development 
Eurocommunism was in many ways only a staging ground for changes in the political structure of the European left. Some, like the Italians, became social democrats while others, like the Dutch, moved into green politics and the French party during the 1980s reverted to a more pro-Soviet stance. Eurocommunism became a force across Europe in 1977, when the PCI's Enrico Berlinguer, the PCE's Santiago Carrillo and the PCF's Georges Marchais met in Madrid and laid out the fundamental lines of the "new way".

Eurocommunist ideas won at least partial acceptance outside of Western Europe. Prominent parties influenced by it outside of Europe were the Communist Party of Australia, the Japanese Communist Party, the Mexican Communist Party and the Venezuelan Movement for Socialism. Soviet leader Mikhail Gorbachev also referred to Eurocommunism as a key influence on the ideas of glasnost and perestroika in his memoirs.

Soviet dissolution 
The breakup of the Soviet Union and the end of the Cold War put practically all leftist parties in Europe on the defensive and made neoliberal reforms the order of the day. Many Eurocommunist parties split, with the right factions (such as the Democrats of the Left or the Initiative for Catalonia Greens) adopting social democracy more whole-heartedly while the left strove to preserve some identifiably communist positions (the Communist Refoundation Party or the PCE and the Living Unified Socialist Party of Catalonia).

Criticism 
Several criticisms have been advanced against Eurocommunism. First, it is alleged by critics that Eurocommunists showed a lack of courage in sufficiently and definitively breaking off from the Soviet Union (for example, the Italian Communist Party took this step only in 1981 after the repression of Solidarność in Poland). This timidity has been explained as the fear of losing old members and supporters, many of whom admired the Soviet Union, or with a pragmatic desire to keep the support of a strong and powerful country.

Other critics point out the difficulties the Eurocommunist parties had in developing a clear and recognisable strategy. They observe that Eurocommunists have always claimed to be different—not only from Soviet communism, but also from social democracy—while in practice they were always very similar to at least one of these two tendencies. As a result, critics argue that Eurocommunism does not have a well-defined identity and cannot be regarded as a separate movement in its own right.

From a Trotskyist point of view in From Stalinism to Eurocommunism: The Bitter Fruits of 'Socialism in One Country, Ernest Mandel views Eurocommunism as a subsequent development of the decision taken by the Soviet Union in 1924 to abandon the goal of world revolution and concentrate on social and economic development of the Soviet Union, the doctrine of socialism in one country. According to this vision, the Eurocommunists of the Italian and French communist parties are considered to be nationalist movements, who together with the Soviet Union abandoned internationalism.

From an anti-revisionist point of view, Enver Hoxha argued in Eurocommunism is Anti-Communism that Eurocommunism is the result of Nikita Khrushchev's policy of peaceful coexistence. Khrushchev was accused of being a revisionist who encouraged conciliation with the bourgeoisie rather than adequately calling for its overthrow by the dictatorship of the proletariat. He also stated that the Soviet Union's refusal to reject Palmiro Togliatti's theory of polycentrism encouraged the various pro-Soviet communist parties to moderate their views in order to join cabinets which in turn forced them to abandon Marxism–Leninism as their leading ideology.

See also

References

Further reading

External links 
 Archive of Eurocommunism at marxists.org
 Eurocommunism is Anti-Communism by Enver Hoxha

Communism
Democratic socialism
Social democracy
Politics of Europe
Marxist schools of thought